Marc Thomas may refer to:
 Marc Thomas (computer scientist)
 Marc Thomas (rugby union)

See also
 Mark Thomas (disambiguation)